The Duninowie also Łabędzie was a Polish knight family. Możnowładcy (magnates) in medieval Poland.

History
The progenitor of the family was Piotr Włostowic, a voivode and adviser of Duke Bolesław III Wrymouth.

Notable members
 Piotr Włostowic - progenitor, castellan of Wrocław, and a ruler (możnowładca) of a part of Silesia 
 Świętosław – son of Piotr Włostowic (?-1153) 
 Sulisław of Cracow (d. 9 April 1241) commanding an army at the Battle of Legnica
 Piotr (?-1198), Archbishop of Gniezno - probably the fundator of the Gniezno Doors
 Piotr Dunin z Prawkowic (ca. 1415-1484) - led the Polish army to victory over the Teutonic Knights in the Battle of Świecino at Malbork castle
 Stanisław Dunin-Karwicki (1640-1724) - politician and political writer
 Marcin Dunin-Sulgostowski (1774-1842) - Primate of Poland 1831-1842
 Jerzy Sewer Dunin-Borkowski (1856 - 1908) count, heraldry, social activist, politician, landowner.
 Stanisław Jan Borkowski (1782-1850) - geologist and philanthropist
 Stanisław Dunin-Wąsowicz (1785-1864) - general of the November Uprising 
 Wincenty Dunin-Marcinkiewicz (1808-1884) – poet, dramatist
 Alfons Dunin-Borkowski (1850-1907) - painter, follower of Jan Matejko
 Teodor Dunin (1854-1909) - physician
 Kazimierz Dunin-Markiewicz (1867-1932) - painter, playwright and theatre director
 Rodryg Dunin (1870-1928) - industrialist and agriculturalist
 Kazimierz Szpotański (1887–1966) - engineer, founder of ZWAR
 Michał Dunin-Wąsowicz (1888-1936) - officer of the Polish Army
 Piotr Dunin-Borkowski (1890-1949) - politician, voivode of Lwów, diplomate
 Rupert Dunin (18th century) - member of the Sejm
 Antoni Dunin (1907–1939) - officer of the Polish Army
 Krzysztof Dunin-Wąsowicz (1923-2013) - historian
 Teresa Dunin-Karwicka (born 1931) - ethnographer
 Isabel Sabogal Dunin-Borkowski (born 1958) - Peruvian translator, editor and astrologer

See also
 Łabędź coat of arms
 Carmen Mauri

Residences

Bibliography
 Kazimierz Śmigiel: Słownik biograficzny arcybiskupów gnieźnieńskich i prymasów Polski, Wydawn. WBP, 2002
 Wojciech Kriegseisen, Ewangelicy polscy i litewscy w epoce saskiej (1696–1763), Warszawa 1996
 "Polski Słownik Biograficzny", t. II, str. 237 i nn.